Anna Laura Härmä (née Numminen; 4 October 1891 – 2 May 1952) was a Finnish trade union functionary and politician. She was born in Urjala. She was a member of the Parliament of Finland, representing the Socialist Workers' Party of Finland (SSTP) from 1922 to 1923 and the Social Democratic Party of Finland (SDP) from 1941 to 1944. When the SSTP was banned in 1923, she was imprisoned on sedition charges. She was later active in the Left Group of Finnish Workers, and in the Social Democratic Party of Finland after that.

References

1891 births
1952 deaths
People from Urjala
People from Häme Province (Grand Duchy of Finland)
Socialist Workers Party of Finland politicians
Left Group of Finnish Workers politicians
Social Democratic Party of Finland politicians
Members of the Parliament of Finland (1919–22)
Members of the Parliament of Finland (1939–45)
Women members of the Parliament of Finland
Prisoners and detainees of Finland
Finnish people of World War II